The Gene Upshaw Award is awarded to the best lineman, offensive or defensive, in NCAA Division II college football. The award is presented by the Manheim Touchdown Club and is recognized by the National Collegiate Athletic Association.

The award is named after former NFL offensive lineman Gene Upshaw, who played college football at Texas A&I University and later for the Oakland Raiders in the NFL. He was inducted into both the College Football Hall of Fame and Pro Football Hall of Fame.

Criteria
 Must be a junior or senior in athletic eligibility and competed in at least 70 percent of the team’s regular season games.
 Must play at one of the following positions: Offensive Linemen: tackles, guards, centers (tight ends are ineligible); Defensive Linemen-ends, tackles, nose guards/tackles.
 Must be of good academic standing (eligible to compete). Ineligible players will be disqualified.
 Must be an All-America or all-region caliber candidate (1st or 2nd team).
 Only one nominee per institution (regardless of position).

Previous winners

Awards won by school 
Schools in italics are no longer Division II members.

External links
Official website

College football national player awards